Governor McNair may refer to:

Alexander McNair (1775–1826), 1st Governor of Missouri
Robert Evander McNair (1923–2007), 108th Governor of South Carolina